Paul Carlton may refer to:

 Paul K. Carlton (1921–2009), commander in chief of the Military Airlift Command
 Paul K. Carlton Jr. (born 1946),  Surgeon General of the United States Air Force